The Provincial Assembly of Lumbini Province also known as the Lumbini Pradesh Sabha, (Nepali: लुम्बिनी प्रदेश सभा) is a unicameral governing and law making body of Lumbini Province, one of the 7 provinces in Nepal, and is situated at Dang, the interim province capital of Lumbini Province, with 60 Members of the Provincial Assembly (MPA).

Kul Prasad KC is the Chief Minister of Lumbini Province. The Speaker of the Assembly is Purna Bahadur Gharti. Umakanta Jha is the first Governor of Lumbini Province. Current Governor Hon. Amik Sherchan is appointed on 27 July 2021 by the President of Nepal.

List of assemblies

Current composition

See also 
 Lumbini Province
 Provincial assemblies of Nepal

References 

Government of Lumbini Province
Province legislatures of Nepal
Unicameral legislatures